Human Rights Act may refer to:

Australia
Human Rights Act 2004 (Australian Capital Territory)
Charter of Human Rights and Responsibilities Act 2006 (Victoria)

Canada
Canadian Human Rights Act (Federal)
Human Rights Act 2003 (Nunavut)

Ireland
European Convention on Human Rights Act 2003

New Zealand
Human Rights Act 1993

United Kingdom
Human Rights Act 1998

United States
Human Rights Act 1977 (District of Columbia)

See also
Bill of rights
Human rights